Procordulia is a genus of dragonfly in the family Corduliidae. Procordulia are found in Southeast Asia, New Guinea, Australia, New Zealand and parts of the Pacific region.

Species
The genus Procordulia includes the following species:

References

Corduliidae
Anisoptera genera
Odonata of Oceania
Odonata of New Zealand
Odonata of Australia
Taxa named by René Martin
Insects described in 1907